Esomus thermoicos is a species of barb in the family Cyprinidae. It is found in freshwater streams, ponds and rivers of southern India and Sri Lanka. It is threatened by habitat loss. It is sometimes considered conspecific with the South Indian flying barb.

References

Esomus
Freshwater fish of Sri Lanka
Fish described in 1842
Taxa named by Achille Valenciennes